Bungalotis is a genus of Neotropical butterflies in the family Hesperiidae (Eudaminae), in which they are placed to genus Phocidini.

Species
The following species and subspecies are recognised in the genus Bungalotis:
Bungalotis erythus (Cramer, 1775)
Bungalotis corentinus (Plötz, 1882)
Bungalotis gagarini O. Mielke, 1967
Bungalotis midas (Cramer, 1775)
Bungalotis aureus Austin, 2008
Bungalotis astylos (Cramer, 1780)
Bungalotis milleri H. Freeman, 1977
Bungalotis quadratum (Sepp, [1845])
Bungalotis quadratum quadratum (Sepp, [1845])
Bungalotis quadratum barba Evans, 1952
Bungalotis sipa de Jong, 1983
Bungalotis clusia Evans, 1952
Bungalotis borax Evans, 1952
Bungalotis lactos Evans, 1952

References 

Natural History Museum Lepidoptera genus database

External links
Images representing Bungalotis  at Consortium for the Barcode of Life

Eudaminae
Hesperiidae of South America
Hesperiidae genera
Taxa named by Edward Yerbury Watson